Jury duty is service as a juror in a legal proceeding.

Jury Duty may also refer to:
Jury Duty (film), a 1995 comedy film starring Pauly Shore
"Jury Duty" (The Office), an episode of the U.S. television series The Office
Jury Duty (TV series), a 2007 syndicated series featuring celebrities serving as jurors